Bni Gmil Maksouline is a small town and rural commune in Al Hoceïma Province of the Tangier-Tetouan-Al Hoceima region of Morocco. At the time of the 2014 census, the commune had a total population of 9922 people living in 1324 households.

References

Populated places in Al Hoceïma Province
Rural communes of Tanger-Tetouan-Al Hoceima